Pseuduvaria is a genus of the plant family Annonaceae and tribe Miliuseae: with a native range is Tropical Asia.

Species
Pseuduvaria contains the following species:
 Pseuduvaria acerosa Y.C.F.Su & R.M.K.Saunders
 Pseuduvaria aurantiaca (Miq.) Merr.
 Pseuduvaria beccarii (Scheff.) J.Sinclair
 Pseuduvaria borneensis Y.C.F.Su & R.M.K.Saunders
 Pseuduvaria brachyantha Y.C.F.Su & R.M.K.Saunders
 Pseuduvaria bruneiensis Y.C.F.Su & R.M.K.Saunders
 Pseuduvaria calliura Airy Shaw
 Pseuduvaria cerina  – Malaysian endemic
 Pseuduvaria clemensiae Y.C.F.Su & R.M.K.Saunders
 Pseuduvaria coriacea Y.C.F.Su & R.M.K.Saunders
 Pseuduvaria costata (Scheff.) J.Sinclair
 Pseuduvaria cymosa (J.Sinclair) Y.C.F.Su & R.M.K.Saunders
 Pseuduvaria dielsiana (Lauterb.) J.Sinclair
 Pseuduvaria dolichonema (Diels) J.Sinclair
 Pseuduvaria filipes (K.Schum. & Lauterb.) J.Sinclair
 Pseuduvaria fragrans Y.C.F.Su, Chaowasku & R.M.K.Saunders
 Pseuduvaria froggattii  – Queensland tropical rain forests endemic, Australia
 Pseuduvaria galeata  – Malaysian endemic
 Pseuduvaria gardneri Y.C.F.Su, Chaowasku & R.M.K.Saunders
 Pseuduvaria glabrescens (Jessup) Y.C.F.Su & R.M.K.Saunders
 Pseuduvaria glossopetala Y.C.F.Su & R.M.K.Saunders
 Pseuduvaria grandifolia (Warb.) J.Sinclair
 Pseuduvaria hylandii  – Queensland tropical rain forests endemic, Australia
 Pseuduvaria kingiana Y.C.F.Su & R.M.K.Saunders
 Pseuduvaria latifolia (Blume) Bakh.f.
 Pseuduvaria lignocarpa J.Sinclair
 Pseuduvaria luzonensis (Merr.) Y.C.F.Su & R.M.K.Saunders
 Pseuduvaria macgregorii Merr.
 Pseuduvaria macrocarpa (Burck) Y.C.F.Su & R.M.K.Saunders
 Pseuduvaria macrophylla 
 Pseuduvaria megalopus (K.Schum.) Y.C.F.Su & Mols
 Pseuduvaria mindorensis Y.C.F.Su & R.M.K.Saunders
 Pseuduvaria mollis (Warb.) J.Sinclair
 Pseuduvaria monticola J.Sinclair
 Pseuduvaria mulgraveana  – Queensland tropical rain forests endemic, Australia
 var. glabrescens  – Queensland tropical rain forests endemic, Australia
 Pseuduvaria multiovulata (C.E.C.Fisch.) J.Sinclair
 Pseuduvaria nervosa  – Malaysian endemic
 Pseuduvaria nova-guineensis J.Sinclair
 Pseuduvaria obliqua Y.C.F.Su & R.M.K.Saunders
 Pseuduvaria oxycarpa (Boerl. ex Koord.-Schum.) Y.C.F.Su & R.M.K.Saunders
 Pseuduvaria pamattonis (Miq.) Y.C.F.Su & R.M.K.Saunders
 Pseuduvaria parvipetala Y.C.F.Su & R.M.K.Saunders
 Pseuduvaria philippinensis Merr.
 Pseuduvaria phuyensis (R.M.K.Saunders, Y.C.F.Su & Chalermglin) Y.C.F.Su & R.M.K.Saunders
 Pseuduvaria prainii  – Indian endemic
 Pseuduvaria pulchella (Diels) J.Sinclair. – Malaysian endemic
 Pseuduvaria reticulata (Blume) Miq.
 Pseuduvaria rugosa (Blume) Merr. 
 Pseuduvaria sessilicarpa (J.Sinclair) Y.C.F.Su & R.M.K.Saunders
 Pseuduvaria sessilifolia J.Sinclair
 Pseuduvaria setosa (King) J.Sinclair
 Pseuduvaria silvestris (Diels) J.Sinclair
 Pseuduvaria subcordata Y.C.F.Su & R.M.K.Saunders
 Pseuduvaria taipingensis J.Sinclair
 Pseuduvaria trimera  – S. China, Burma, Thailand, Vietnam
 Pseuduvaria unguiculata (Elmer) Y.C.F.Su & R.M.K.Saunders
 Pseuduvaria villosa  – Queensland tropical rain forests endemic, Australia

References 

 
Annonaceae genera
Taxonomy articles created by Polbot
Taxa named by Friedrich Anton Wilhelm Miquel